St. Benilde School, officially St. Benilde School, Inc.  or colloquially known as Benilde, is a Private Catholic High school and Elementary school in Lasalleville, Mansilingan, Bacolod, Philippines. It is one of the Lasallian educational institutions in the country. Benilde underwent through the supervision of University of St. La Salle and the De La Salle Brothers, and is now a member of Association of Lasallian Affiliated Schools (ALAS), a network of Lasallian private schools. The school serves the community of students from neighboring subdivisions such as Lasalleville, St. Benilde Homes, Grandville, Hillside, Forest Hills, and Regent Pearl. It was founded as a La Salle School by Br. Rolando Dizon FSC, a past President of De La Salle University, Manila, in 1987.

History & Objectives 

Saint Bénilde Romançon was selected as the name and patron saint to symbolize its objective of providing the students the legacy of "Doing ordinary things, extra-ordinarily well". The school was founded on 1987 by the former DLSU - Manila President Br. Rolando Dizon, FSC. The mission of St. Benilde commits to provide students a balanced, quality, and transformative education accessible to all, and geared towards the attachment of their full potential. Benilde envisions a world-class community of holistically developed 21st century learners that are globally equipped, competent, and responsible individuals. The school faculty and staff foster responsibility in nurturing atmosphere and provide a variety of spiritual, academic, and extracurricular opportunities for student involvement. In 2012, the school claimed its independence from the supervision of University of St. La Salle and has been a certified Lasallian school.

Campus 

Br. Dizon FSC Activity Center, the school gymnasium in the honor of the school founder, Br. Rolando Dizon, FSC.

Elementary School, Intermediate School, and High School
The elementary and intermediate are in the right wing of the building while junior high school is in the left wing. Because of the small population of the school, there is only one sector per year level in elementary, intermediate, and high school; each sector was named after the De La Salle Saints, Martyrs, and Blesseds.

Years and Sectors:
Year 1: Blessed Br. Julian Reche
Year 2: Blessed Br. Jean Bernard
Year 3: St. Solomon
Year 4: St. Mutien Marie 
Year 5: St. Jaime Hilario
Year 6: St. Miguel Febres
Year 7: Blessed Br. Cirilo-Bertran
Year 8: Blessed Br. Benito De Jesus
Year 9: Blessed Br. Julian Alfredo
Year 10: Blessed Br. Aniceto Adolfo

Benilde Student Life 

Benilde offers organizations, as well as athletics. The athletics program includes varsity football, basketball, volleyball, table tennis, and chess. School organizations includes the Student Affairs Council (SAC), Campus Peer Ministry (CPM), CPM Choir, and St. Benilde CHIMES: The official school publication of St. Benilde. The school also offer Junior Police Unit (JPU), the disciplinary program for Year 8 to Year 10 in secondary school.

Lasallian sister schools 

 De La Salle University
 De La Salle - College of Saint Benilde
 La Salle Greenhills
 De La Salle Araneta University
 De La Salle Santiago Zobel School
 University of Saint La Salle
 St. Joseph School-La Salle

References

External links
 Partial list of La Salle schools & educational institutions throughout the archipelago
 De La Salle supervised schools

Catholic secondary schools in the Philippines
De La Salle Philippines
Schools in Bacolod
Private schools in the Philippines
Bacolod
Educational institutions established in 1987
1987 establishments in the Philippines